Mamadou Ibra Mbacke Fall (born 21 November 2002) is a Senegalese professional footballer who plays as a defender for Segunda División club Villarreal CF B, on loan from Los Angeles FC.

Club career
Born in Rufisque, Senegal, Fall moved to Orlando, Florida in the United States to join the Montverde Academy as part of Sport4Charity, an organization ran by former Senegal international footballer Salif Diao. On 5 June 2021, Fall joined Major League Soccer club Los Angeles FC, signing a two-year contract.

On 11 June 2021, Fall was loaned by Los Angeles FC to their USL Championship affiliate Las Vegas Lights. He made his professional debut for the club later that night against San Antonio FC, starting and playing 79 minutes in the 1–1 draw. On September 3, 2021, Fall scored a brace in a 4–0 win over Sporting Kansas City.

On 25 August 2022, Fall was loaned to Villarreal in Spain until June 2023, where he had previously trained with their youth teams. The following day, the loan deal was confirmed, with the player being assigned to the reserves in Segunda División.

International career
Fall was called up to the Senegal under-17 side in 2019.

Career statistics

References

External links
 Profile at Los Angeles FC

2002 births
Living people
Senegalese footballers
Association football defenders
Los Angeles FC players
Las Vegas Lights FC players
USL Championship players
Senegalese expatriate footballers
Expatriate soccer players in the United States
People from Rufisque
Senegalese expatriate sportspeople in the United States
Major League Soccer players
Villarreal CF B players
Expatriate footballers in Spain
Senegalese expatriate sportspeople in Spain